Pietro Urbano was an Italian artist of the Renaissance period. He was born in Pistoia, and was a pupil of Michelangelo as a sculptor.  He was dismissed from Michelangelo's service for allegedly defacing the master's Risen Christ, rather than completing the finer details onsite at the church of Santa Maria sopra Minerva, as he had been charged.  According to Michelangelo's confidant Sebastiano del Piombo, "all he has worked on is completely disfigured."  Urbano subsequently absconded with pilfered jewelry and clothing, fleeing to Rome with the stolen goods in order to gamble and engage prostitutes.

In the Roman Basilica of Santa Maria in Ara Coeli, he sculpted the funeral monument of Cecchino Brachi, another pupil of Michelangelo, dead at the age of sixteen.

References

People from Pistoia
16th-century Italian painters
Italian male painters
Painters from Tuscany
Italian Renaissance painters